Jonathan Michael Gunn is an American independent film director and screenwriter best known for his work in the independent film industry.

Filmography

References

External links 
 

Year of birth missing (living people)
Living people
American film directors
American male writers